Metropolitan Michael Staikos (22 November 1946 – 18 October 2011) was the second Eastern Orthodox metropolitan bishop of Austria; he held the position from 1991 until his death.

Notes

1946 births
2011 deaths
Bishops of the Ecumenical Patriarchate of Constantinople
Eastern Orthodox bishops in Europe